The Thirteenth Wisconsin Legislature convened from January 11, 1860, to April 2, 1860, in regular session.

Senators representing even-numbered districts were newly elected for this session and were serving the first year of a two-year term. Assembly members were elected to a one-year term. Assembly members and odd-numbered senators were elected in the general election of November 8, 1859. Senators representing odd-numbered districts were serving the second year of their two-year term, having been elected in the general election held on November 2, 1858.

Major events
 January 2, 1860: 2nd Inauguration of Alexander Randall as Governor of Wisconsin.
 January 7, 1860: Assemblymember Andrew Eble, representing southwest Milwaukee County, died in a hunting accident.
 January 17, 1860: Assemblymember Daniel C. Jenne, representing Outagamie County, resigned his seat after it was demonstrated that he had actually lost his election to Milo Coles.
 January 23, 1860: Theodore Hartung won a special election to fill the Assembly vacancy created by Andrew Eble's death.
 November 6, 1860: Abraham Lincoln elected 16th President of the United States.
 December 24, 1860: Declaration of the Immediate Causes Which Induce and Justify the Secession of South Carolina from the Federal Union issued by the government of South Carolina.

Major legislation
 March 27, 1860: Act to organize the county of Ashland, 1860 Act 211
 March 28, 1860: Joint Resolution relative to grants of public lands to actual settlers and to passage of "The Homestead Bill," 1860 Joint Resolution 1
 March 30, 1860: Act to establish an official State paper, 1860 Act 240. Established the Wisconsin State Journal as the official state paper.
 March 30, 1860: Joint Resolution objecting to any change of the Naturalization Law, 1860 Joint Resolution 2
 March 31, 1860: Joint Resolution in relation to the Homestead Bill in Congress, 1860 Joint Resolution 3

Party summary

Senate summary

Assembly summary

Sessions
 1st Regular session: January 11, 1860 – April 2, 1860

Leaders

Senate leadership
 President of the Senate: Butler G. Noble, Lieutenant Governor
 President pro tempore: Moses M. Davis

Assembly leadership
 Speaker of the Assembly: William P. Lyon

Members

Members of the Senate
Members of the Wisconsin Senate for the Thirteenth Wisconsin Legislature:

Members of the Assembly
Members of the Assembly for the Thirteenth Wisconsin Legislature:

Employees

Senate employees
 Chief Clerk: John H. Warren
 Assistant Clerk: Willard Merrill
 Engrossing Clerk: J. B. Selby
 Enrolling Clerk: G. M. Powell
 Transcribing Clerk: A. L. Burke
 Sergeant-at-Arms: Asa Kinney
 Assistant Sergeant-at-Arms: S. S. Keyes
 Postmaster: James L. Wilder
 Post Messenger: Garret J. Mahoney
 Doorkeeper: Henry M. Higbee
 Fireman: Franz G. L. Struve
 Messengers:
 William W. Worthington
 Walter C. Wyman
 Sylvester Mygatt

Assembly employees
 Chief Clerk: L. H. D. Crane
 Assistant Clerk: John S. Dean
 Engrossing Clerk: R. S. Kingman
 Enrolling Clerk: Thaddeus C. Pound
 Transcribing Clerk: E. Gilbert Jackson
 Sergeant-at-Arms: Joseph Gates
 Assistant Sergeant-at-Arms: A. Armstrong
 Postmaster: Marcus Otterbourg
 Assistant Postmaster: Chancey B. Valentine
 Doorkeeper: William C. Lessure
 Assistant Doorkeeper: John T. Taylor
 Firemen:
 Nelson C. Andrews
 Stephen S. Woodward
 Phillip Cary
 Robert R. Jores
 Messengers:
 Samuel H. Fernandez
 Carlton C. Hart
 Edward Livingston
 William H. Barnes
 George W. Yout
 William H. Bennett

Notes

References

External links

1860 in Wisconsin
Wisconsin
Wisconsin legislative sessions